

Argentine Navy

 ARA BDT-1/Q41
 ARA Cabo San Diego (BDT-2)
 ARA Cabo San Francisco de Paula (BDT-3)
 ARA Cabo San Gonzalo (BDT-4/Q44)
 ARA Cabo San Antonio (Q42)
 ARA Cabo San Isidro (BDT-6/Q46)
 ARA Cabo San Pablo (BDT-7)
 ARA Cabo Pio (BDT-10/Q50)
 ARA Cabo San Sebastian (BDT-11)
 ARA BDT-12
 ARA Cabo Buen Tiempo (BDT-13)
 ARA Cabo San Vincente (BDT-14)

Brazilian Navy

 NDCC Almirante Sabóia (G-25)
 NDCC Mattoso Maia (G-28)
 NDCC Garcia D'Avilla (G-29)
 NDD Ceará (G-30)

Royal Brunei Navy 

 KDB Damuam (L-31)
 KDB Puni (L-32)
 KDB Serasa (L-33)
 KDB Teraban (L-34)

Chilean Navy

 BACH Comandante Hemmerdinger (LST-88)
 BACH Comandate Araya (LST-89)

Ecuadorian Navy

 Hualcopo (T-55, T-61, TR-61)

Hellenic Navy
Aliakmon (L104)
Five Jason-class tank landing ship:
 HS Chios (L 173)
 HS Samos (L 174)
 HS Ikaria (L 175)
 HS Lesvos (L 176)
 HS Rodos (L 177)

Indonesian Navy

Active

:
 

:
 
 
 
 

:
 
 
 
 
 
 
 
 
 
 
 

:
 
 
 
 
 
 
 
 
 

Decommissioned

:
 

:
 
 
 
 
 
 
 
 
 

:
 

:
 
 

:
 
 
 

KRI Teluk Peleng foundered during a sinking incident on 18 November 2013

Indian Navy

3 ships of Shardul Class:

 INS Shardul (L16)
 INS Kesari (L15) 
 INS Airavat (L24)

2 ships of Magar Class:

INS Magar (L20)
INS Gharial (L23)

8 ships of Kumbhir Class a variant of the Polnocny C and D Class landing ships:

INS Ghorpad (L14) (decommissioned)
 (L15) (decommissioned)
 (L16) (decommissioned)
INS Sharabh (L17) (decommissioned)
INS Cheetah (L18)
INS Mahish (L19)
INS Guldar (L21)
INS Kumbhir (L22)

The Indian Navy also previously operated the Gharial class the local name for the Polnocny A class landing ship

Republic of Korea Navy

 ROKS Wi Bong (LST-812/676)
 ROKS Su Yong (LST-813/677)
 ROKS Buk Han (LST-815/678)
 ROKS Hwa San (LST-816/679)

Philippine Navy

 BRP Suriago Del Sur
 BRP Lanao Del Norte (LST-504)
 Former USS LST-607
 BRP Agusan del Sur
 Misamis Oriental (LT-40)

Russian Navy/Soviet Navy 
In Russian they are Large Landing Ships, in the U.S. Navy Hull Designation they are LST (Landing Ship, Tank).
Alligator-class landing ship
Ropucha I and II-class landing ship
Ivan Gren-class landing ship

Sri Lanka Navy 
SLNS Shathi (L880)

Spanish Navy

Republic of Singapore Navy 

 RSS Endurance (L-201)
 RSS Excellence (L-202)
 RSS Intrepid (L-203)
 RSS Resolution (L-204)
 RSS Persistence (L-205)
 RSS Perseverance (L-206)
 RSS Endurance (L-207)
 RSS Resolution (L-208)
 RSS Persistence (L-209)
 RSS Endeavor (L-210)

Republic of Vietnam Navy

 RVN Nha Trang (HQ-505)

Royal Thai Navy
 HTMS Sichang (LST 721)
 HTMS Surin (LST 722)

Turkish Navy 

 TCG Sarucabey (NL-123)
 TCG Karamürsel (NL-124)
 TCG Osman Gazi (NL-125)
 TCG Bayraktar (L-402)
 TCG Sancaktar (L-403)

Royal Navy (United Kingdom)

During the Second World War most LSTs were un-named, names were given to those kept in service post war.

Maracaibo-class Mark I landing ship, tank
 
 
 
LST Mk 1
 
 
 

 LST 3001/Frederick Glover
 LST 3002
 LST 3003/HMS Anzio
 LST 3004
 LST 3005
 LST 3006/HMS Tromsø
 LST 3007
 LST 3008
 LST 3009/SS Regiunald Kerr
 LST 3010/HMS Attacker/HMS Empire Cymric - LST Mk 3.
 HMS Avenger (LST 3011)
 LST 3012/HMS Ben Nevis
 LST 3013/HMS Ben Lomond
 LST 3014
 LST 3015/HMS Battler
 LST 3016/HMS Dieppe
 LST 3017/HMAS Tarakan
 LST 3018
 LST 3019/HMS Vaagso
 LST 3020
 LST 3021
 LST 3022
 LST 3023
 LST 3024
 LST 3025/HMS Bruiser
 LST 3026/HMS Charger
 LST 3027/HMS Lofoten
 LST 3028
 LST 3029/HMS Chaser
 LST 3030
 LST 3031
 LST 3032
 LST 3033
 LST 3034
 LST 3035/HMAS Lae
 LST 3036/HMS Puncher
 LST 3037
 LST 3038/HMS Fighter
 LST 3039
 LST 3040
 LST 3041
 LST 3042/HMS Hunter
 LST 3043/HMS Messina
 LST 3044/HMS Narvik
 LST 3045
 LST 3501 - to Australia as HMAS Labuan
 LST 3502
 LST 3503
 LST 3504/HMS Pursuer
 LST 3505/HMS Ravager
 LST 3506
 LST 3507
 LST 3508/HMS Searcher
 LST 3509
 LST 3510/HMS Slinger
 LST 3511/HMS Reggio
 LST 3512
 LST 3513/HMS Salerno
 LST 3514/HMS Smiter
 LST 3515/HMS Stalker
 LST 3516/HMS Striker
 LST 3517/HMS St Nazaire
 LST 3518/HMS Suvla
 LST 3519
 LST 3520/HMS Thruster
 LST 3521
 LST 3522/HMS Tracker
 LST 3523/HMS Trouncer
 LST 3524/HMS Trumpeter
 LST 3525/HMS Walcheren
 LST 3526
 LST 3527
 LST 3528
 LST 3529
 LST 3530
 LST 3531
 LST 3532/HMS Zeebrugge
 LST 3533
 LST 3534

LST 3535 to LST 3575 were all cancelled.

United States Navy

 USS LST-1
 USS LST-5
 USS LST-10
 
 

 USS LST-15
 USS LST-16
 
 
 USS LST-19
 
 
 
 
 
 
 
 
 USS LST-29
 USS LST-31
 USS LST-32
 USS LST-50
 USS LST-57
 USS LST-58
 USS LST-60
 USS LST-70
 USS LST-81
 USS LST-82
 USS LST-83
 USS LST-84
 USS LST-119
 USS LST-132
 USS LST-136
 USS LST-141
 USS LST-209
 USS LST-231
 USS LST-264
 USS LST-266
 USS LST-279
 USS LST-285
 USS LST-288
 USS LST-289
 USS LST-306
 USS LST-310
 USS LST-316
 USS LST-317
 USS LST-325

 USS LST-332
 USS LST-340
 USS LST-344
 USS LST-345
 USS LST-350
 USS LST-353
 USS LST-356
 USS LST-357
 USS LST-374
 USS LST-380
 USS LST-389
 USS LST-391
 USS LST-393
 USS LST-400

 USS LST-453
 USS LST-454
 USS LST-455
 USS LST-472
 USS LST-482
 USS LST-483

 USS LST-494
 USS LST-496
 USS LST-499
 USS LST-507
 USS LST-511
 USS LST-515
 USS LST-531
 USS LST-545
 USS LST-546
 USS LST-558
 USS LST-566
 
 
 
 
 
 USS LST-607
 USS LST-618
 USS LST-622
 USS LST-661
 USS LST-710
 USS LST-712
 USS LST-734
 USS LST-738
 USS LST-749
 USS LST-766
 USS LST-767
 USS LST-801
 USS LST-814
 USS LST-823
 USS LST-826
 USS LST-828
 USS LST-842
 USS LST-843
 USS LST-848
 USS LST-849
 USS LST-851
 USS LST-853
 USS LST-872
 USS LST-874
 USS LST-875
 USS LST-884
 USS LST-896
 USS LST-900
 USS LST-902
 USS LST-906
 USS LST-911
 USS LST-919
 USS LST-945
 USS LST-980
 USS LST-981
 USS LST-982
 USS LST-983
 USS LST-984
 USS LST-985
 USS LST-986
 USS LST-987
 USS LST-988
 USS LST-989
 USS LST-990
 USS LST-991
 USS LST-992
 USS LST-993
 USS LST-994
 USS LST-995
 USS LST-996
 USS LST-997
 USS LST-998
 USS LST-999
 USS LST-1000
 USS LST-1001
 USS LST-1044
 USS LST-1066
 USS LST-1067
 USS LST-1069
 USS LST-1073
 USS LST-1080
 USS LST-1082
 USS LST-1084
 USS LST-1104
 USS LST-1108
 USS LST-1123
 USS LST-1138
 USS LST-1146
 USS De Soto County (LST-1171)
 USS Waldo County (LST-1163)

References

USS Sumner County LST 1148